The Selamta Family Project supports vulnerable children and families in Ethiopia.

Outreach Program: 
By strengthening biological families, fewer children will become orphaned or abandoned. Selamta walks with families from their point of crisis, into education and employment, and onto self-sufficiency.

Forever Family Program: 
When children have been orphaned or abandoned and reunification is not possible, we bring together 8-10 children with a Selamta trained mom to start a new family in their own home.

Selamta embraces an in-country, family-based, community-integrated approach to equip and empower all of our  families. We build this foundation of family on four cornerstones: 
 Education
 Health & Wellness
 Psychosocial Support
 Spiritual & Life Skills Development.

For more information: Selamta's website

Selamta's Forever Family Model Video

Episode 1 of "The Advocates" by The Archibald Project, documenting Selamta's Forever Family Model.

Key partners
 She's The First
 AmazonSmile
 GuideStar
 The Archibald Project
 *Ethiopian Government
 *Ethiopian Embassy
 UniversalGiving

References

External links
 Selamta Family Project

Children's charities based in the United States
Foreign charities operating in Ethiopia